Zekelita is a genus of moths of the family Erebidae. The genus was erected by Francis Walker in 1863.

Zekelita amseli (Wiltshire, 1961) Afghanistan
Zekelita angulalis (Mabille, 1880) Madagascar
Zekelita angulata (Walker, 1862) northern India, Kashmir, Dharmsala
Zekelita antiqualis (Hübner, [1809]) south-eastern Europe, Turkey, Syria, Lebanon, Afghanistan
Zekelita antistropha (Vari, 1962) southern Africa
Zekelita biformatalis (Leech, 1900)
Zekelita chalcias (T. P. Lucas, 1894) Queensland
Zekelita cretacea (Warren, 1913) Kashmir
Zekelita curvatula (Warren, 1913) Kashmir
Zekelita diagonalis (Alphéraky, 1882) Tian-Shan
Zekelita endoleuca (Hampson, 1916) Somalia
Zekelita equalisella Walker, 1863 southern Africa
Zekelita larseni (Wiltshire, 1983) Oman
Zekelita mandarinalis (Leech, 1900)
Zekelita orientis (Brandt, 1938) Iran
Zekelita plusioides (Butler, 1879) Japan
Zekelita poliopera (Hampson, 1902) southern Africa
Zekelita ravalis (Herrich-Schäffer, [1851]) Cyprus, Turkey, Levant, Arabia, south-west Asia, India, southern Africa, Madagascar
Zekelita ravulalis (Staudinger, 1878) southern Urals, Iraq, Iran, Israel, Tadjikistan, Kazakhstan, Turkmenistan
Zekelita sagittalis (Rebel, 1948) Egypt
Zekelita sagittata (Butler, 1889) Dharmsala
Zekelita schwingenschussi (Wagner, 1913) Ili
Zekelita soricalis (Püngeler, 1909)
Zekelita vartianae (Wiltshire, 1971) Afghanistan

References

Hypeninae